CJ ENM Commerce Div. is a South Korean first home shopping created by CJ Group in March 1995.

In July 2018, CJ O Shopping merged with CJ E&M to create a new company CJ ENM.

History
CJ O Shopping, CJ's cable home shopping channel, entered into China in 2004, India in 2009, Japan and Vietnam in 2011, Thailand and Turkey in 2012, the Philippines (together with ABS-CBN) in 2013 and Mexico (together with Televisa) in 2015.

In 2018, it was announced that CJ E&M will be merging with CJ O Shopping, creating a new company.

See also
 CJ Group

Notes

References

External links
 

 
O Shopping
Mass media companies established in 1994
Companies listed on KOSDAQ
Mass media companies disestablished in 2018
2018 disestablishments in South Korea
2018 mergers and acquisitions
South Korean companies established in 1994